The Logia Adelphia is a historic building located in Mayagüez, Puerto Rico.  It was built in 1912, and was designed by Sabas Honore, a prominent local architect.  It was listed on the U.S. National Register of Historic Places, for its architecture, in 1986.  The north facade, facing on the street, is elaborate and preserved.  The interior has been renovated, and no longer reflects its original design.

In 1984, the building was still being used by Adelphia Lodge #1, the oldest Masonic Lodge located in Mayagüez.

See also

Logia Masónica Hijos de la Luz, in Yauco, Puerto Rico, also listed on the National Register
List of Masonic buildings in the United States
National Register of Historic Places listings in Mayagüez, Puerto Rico

References

National Register of Historic Places in Mayagüez, Puerto Rico
Masonic buildings completed in 1912
1912 establishments in Puerto Rico
Masonic buildings in Puerto Rico
Clubhouses on the National Register of Historic Places in Puerto Rico